Grey parrot may refer to:

Parrots
 Grey parrot (also Congo grey parrot or African grey parrot) (Psittacus erithacus)
 Timneh parrot (also Timneh grey parrot) (Psittacus timneh)
 Thirioux’s grey parrot (Psittacula bensoni), also known as Mascarene grey parakeet, or Mauritius grey parrot, a little-known extinct parrot

Plants
 Grey parrot-pea (Dillwynia cinerascens), a plant in the pea family (Fabaceae), native to Australia

Animal common name disambiguation pages